Uroptychus singularis is a species of chirostylid squat lobster first found in Taiwan. This species is distinguished from U. australis by its single, unpaired terminal spine on its flexor margin of pereopods 2–4.

References

Further reading
Baba, Keiji, et al. "Eumunida Smith, 1883."
Baeza, J. Antonio. "8 Squat lobsters as symbionts and in chemo-autotrophic environments." The Biology of Squat Lobsters 20 (2011): 249.
Osawa, Masayuki, Chia-Wei Lin, and Tin-Yam Chan. "Additional records of Chirostylus and Munidopsis (Crustacea: Decapoda: Galatheoidea) from Taiwan." The Raffles Bulletin of Zoology, Supplement 19 (2008): 91-98.

External links

WORMS

Squat lobsters
Crustaceans described in 2008